Vitreledonella richardi, also known as the glass octopus, is an incirrate octopus. It is in the genus Vitreledonella and of the family Amphitretidae.

Description
The upper three pairs of arms are subequal in length; in juveniles about as long as the mantle, in adults two to three times mantle length. The fourth, ventral pair is slightly shorter. Suckers are small, widely separated, and in a single series. In males, the left arm III is hectocotylized, with a spherical vesicle near the tip, but is not detachable. The large ampulla and the elongate accessory gland lie out among the internal reproductive organs, notable among mature males alongside its reproductive anatomical counterparts. Its eyes are rectangular, as seen from the side. In accordance to its eyes; Two Vitreledonella richardi specimens obtained at 200 m in the North Atlantic were used to characterize the elongated eye. It is demonstrated that the cylindrical design, with the lens centered, results in a restricted horizontal field of vision. The unique morphology is thought to be an adaptation that reduces the eye's silhouette when viewed from below, and is part of the animal's camouflage technique. The radula is heterodont, also known as heteroglossan, in which the middle or rhachidian tooth in each array has multiple cusps and the lateral teeth are unicuspid.

Vitreledonella richardi is ovoviviparous. The female broods her eggs, of which hundreds are within the mantle cavity. The young paralarvae are left to fend for themselves as the mother quickly dies after their birth.

Researchers in Central Marine Fisheries Research Institute, conducted an experiment that later concluded young paralarvae beaks change as they get older, along with the depth of water which they want to live in. Younger paralarvae have stronger beaks to tear prey's flesh off since that was all they ate. Once they got older, they lose that beak and form a faint less developed one to eat softer bodied prey. With their diet changing, they are predicted to move up from deeper levels (between 310 and 440, but can be as far as 1000m) to the subsurface (between 110 and 300m) as they get older.

Ecology 
Found mostly in the tropic and subtropic regions of seas worldwide, the glass octopus is prey to the feeding ecology of Northern bottlenose whales. More specifically noted is that of Tåsinge whale.

References

 
 Sajikumar, K. K., Venkatesan, V., Jeyabaskaran, R., Muhammed, A., & Mohamed, K. S. (2016). First record of the glass octopus Vitreledonella richardi (Cephalopoda: Vitreledonellidae) from the Arabian Sea. Marine Biodiversity Records, 9, 1–4.

External links
 Tree of Life web project: Vitreledonella 
  Vitreledonella richardi - Marine species identification

Octopuses
Molluscs described in 1918